Zodiac Castings was a company that produced miniature figures.

Description
Zodiac Castings, a company based in Liverpool, first started manufacturing fantasy miniatures in the 1980s. They cast using resin rather than metal, and produced 25 mm scale accessories such as fireplaces, pentagrams and tombs.

Reception
In Issue 20 of Imagine (November 1984), Ian Knight found the resin-cast accessories to be competently made, but unimaginative, calling them "fairly routine [...] there is little to recommend Zodiac over their better-established rivals." Knight liked the fact that the pieces were cheap, and concluded, "No doubt Zodiac, like everyone else, will improve with experience and expand when their imagination takes off, and that may be worth waiting for."

References

Gaming miniatures companies